A stray dog is a lost or abandoned free-ranging dog.

Stray Dog, The Stray Dog or Stray Dogs may also refer to:

Books
 The Stray Dog (short story collection), a 1942 collection by Iranian author Sadegh Hedayat
 "The Stray Dog" (short story), a 1942 story by Sadegh Hedayat
 The Stray Dog (Simont book), a 2001 children's picture book by Marc Simont
 Stray Dog, a 1999 work by manga artist Hiromu Arakawa
Stray Dogs, a 1997 novel by John Ridley
Stray Dogs (comic), a 2020 comic by Tony Fleecs

Film and TV 
 Stray Dog (film), a 1949 film by Akira Kurosawa
 StrayDog: Kerberos Panzer Cops, a 1991 film directed by Mamoru Oshii
 Stray Dogs (1989 film), a Soviet film directed by Dmitry Svetozarov
 Stray Dogs (2004 film), an Iranian film by Marzieh Meshkini
 Stray Dogs (2013 film), a Taiwanese film by Tsai Ming-liang
 Stray Dogs (2014 film), a South Korean film by Ha Won-jun
 "The Stray Dog (Fullmetal Alchemist)", the 43rd episode of the Fullmetal Alchemist television series

Music 
 Stray Dog (band), a heavy blues-based hard rock band of the early seventies
 Stray Dog, a pseudonym of Dutch deejay Tiësto
 Stray Dog, the band Stray Dog (band)'s 1973 album
 Stray Dog (album), a 2001 album by Hal Crook
 Stray Dogs (album), a 2003 album by the Norwegian singer/songwriter Thomas Dybdahl
 "Stray Dog", a song, featuring Iggy Pop, on the 2015 album Music Complete, by English rock band New Order

Other uses 
 Stray Dog Café, a café in St. Petersburg, Russia

See also 
 War of the Stray Dog, an October 1925 brief conflict at Petrich between Greece and Bulgaria
 Wild dog (disambiguation)